Diyaeddine Abzi (born 23 November 1998) is a professional soccer player who plays for Ligue 2 club Pau FC as a left-back. Born in Morocco, he represented Canada at youth international level.

Early life
Born in Fez, Morocco, Abzi moved to Montreal at age nine, where he began playing youth soccer with FS Salaberry.

Club career

Salaberry
In 2015, Abzi played for FS Salaberry at the U21 level, scoring one goal in three appearances. The following year, he made his senior debut with Salaberry in LSEQ Division 2 and made a total of six appearances that season as Salaberry earned promotion to D1. At the U21 level for Salaberry that year, he scored fourteen goals in thirteen appearances. In 2017, Abzi scored ten goals in thirteen appearances for Salaberry in D1, leading the club and finishing third in league scoring. In U21 play, Abzi scored 26 goals in 15 appearances.

Blainville
In 2018, Abzi played for defending PLSQ champions Blainville, making twenty appearances and scoring two goals in league play. In the Canadian Championship, Abzi scored the lone goal in Blainville's 1–0 win over Oakville Blue Devils in the second leg of the First Preliminary Round. He then appeared as a substitute in both games of Blainville's Second Preliminary Round series against Ottawa Fury.

York United
On 22 February 2019, Abzi signed with Canadian Premier League side York9 (later York United). On 27 April 2019, he made his professional debut as a substitute in the inaugural CPL match against Forge FC. Abzi scored his first goal for the club on 12 October 2019, against Forge. That season, he made a total of 24 league appearances and six in the Canadian Championship.

On 4 December 2019, Abzi re-signed with York for the 2020 season. On 29 April 2020, he signed a further contract extension until at least 2022. In 2021, he continued to play a crucial role for York, and was described as "one of the most dynamic and talented" players in the league. York finished in fourth place in the regular season, which qualified them to the semifinals, where they were defeated by Forge FC. Scoring 6 goals and 3 assists that season as a fullback, at the conclusion of the season he was ranked the 4th best player in the league. There was interest from Major League Soccer club Toronto FC to bring him in for a trial, however, an injury prevented Abzi from attending. At the time of his departure in the summer of 2022, he was York's all-time appearance leader.

Pau
On 15 June 2022, York United announced the transfer of Abzi to French club Pau FC of Ligue 2, effective 1 July, where he signed a three-year contract.He made his debut for Pau on July 30 in their season opener, starting the match and playing the full 90 minutes in a 4-0 defeat to Guingamp. Abzi scored his first goal for Pau against Paris FC on January 31, 2023.

International career

Canada Futsal
In January 2018, Abzi played futsal for Canada in a friendly against Costa Rica, netting a goal in a 5-4 defeat.

Canada
Abzi was called up to the Canadian U-23 provisional roster for the 2020 CONCACAF Men's Olympic Qualifying Championship on February 26, 2020 and made one appearance for the side against Mexico.

Career statistics

References

External links

 
 

1998 births
Living people
Association football fullbacks
Canadian soccer players
Moroccan footballers
People from Fez, Morocco
Soccer players from Montreal
Moroccan emigrants to Canada
Naturalized citizens of Canada
Canadian expatriate soccer players
Moroccan expatriate footballers
Expatriate footballers in France
Canadian expatriate sportspeople in France
Moroccan expatriate sportspeople in France
A.S. Blainville players
York United FC players
Pau FC players
Première ligue de soccer du Québec players
Canadian Premier League players
Ligue 2 players
Canadian men's futsal players